The following is a list of 1996 Seattle Mariners draft picks. The Mariners took part in the June regular draft, also known as the Rule 4 draft. The Mariners made 60 selections in the 1996 draft, the first being pitcher Gil Meche in the first round. In all, the Mariners selected 35 pitchers, 11 outfielders, 5 catchers, 4 shortstops, 4 third basemen, and 1 second baseman.

Draft

Key

Table

References
General references

Inline citations

External links
Seattle Mariners official website